The following is a timeline of the COVID-19 pandemic in the United Kingdom in 2023.

There are significant differences in the legislation and the reporting between the countries of the UK: England, Scotland, Northern Ireland, and Wales. The numbers of cases and deaths are reported on a government website updated daily during the pandemic. The Office for National Statistics continues to publish estimates of the number of infections (excluding hospitals, care homes and other communal settings) in each country, using regular nose/throat swabs and blood samples. The UK-wide Zoe Health Study (previously the COVID Symptom Study) which is based on surveys of numerous participants, run by health science company ZOE, and analysed by King's College London researchers, publishes daily estimates of the number of new and total current COVID-19 infections (excluding care homes) in UK regions, without restriction to only laboratory-confirmed cases.

Events

January 2023
 2 January –
 The UK Health Security Agency issues advice to parents in England, urging them to keep their children off school if they are ill or have a fever. The advice comes amid high cases of COVID-19, influenza, and scarlet fever.
 The Office for National Statistics estimates that 2.0 million people in private households in the UK have long COVID (with symptoms, primarily fatigue and difficulty concentrating, continuing for more than four weeks after a confirmed or suspected COVID infection). 1.5million of them say their daily activities are adversely affected.
 3 January – Speaking amid mounting concern about hospital delays, Health Secretary Steve Barclay warns that flu and COVID-19 are putting "massive pressure" on the National Health Service. He also says that reducing the waiting list backlog caused by the pandemic will "take time".
 5 January – Legislation comes into effect which requires air passengers travelling from mainland China to England to provide proof of a negative COVID test before departure.
 6 January – The latest Office for National Statistics data suggests almost three million people were infected with COVID-19 over the Christmas period (the highest since July 2022), with one in 20 having the virus in England, one in 18 in Wales, one in 25 in Scotland and one in 16 in Northern Ireland. XBB.1.5, the new Omicron variant of the virus, is believed to be responsible for one in 200 infections in the UK.
 10 January –
 A team of researchers from the Wellcome Sanger Institute is to analyse millions of UK COVID-19 test samples for other serious respiratory viruses, including flu.
 It is confirmed that the regional Enhanced Therapies and Rehabilitation unit at Whiteabbey Hospital, originally commissioned as one of Northern Ireland's Nightingale Hospitals in November 2020, is to be closed at the end of March 2023.
 11 January – Andrew Bridgen, the MP for North West Leicestershire, is suspended from the Conservative Party for spreading misinformation about COVID-19 vaccines after posting a tweet comparing them to The Holocaust.
 13 January –
 Medical experts criticise the BBC for an interview with Aseem Malhotra who claims that mRNA vaccines may have been responsible for thousands of excess deaths.
 An inquest into the deaths of Gareth Morgan Roberts and Dominga David, two nurses who died of COVID-19 in April 2020, concludes that it is more likely than not that they died after becoming infected while at work.
 The latest Office for National Statistics data indicates COVID-19 cases were falling in England and Wales in the week up to 30 December 2022, with cases continuing to increase in Scotland; the picture was unclear for Northern Ireland. In England, an estimated 2,189,300 people were thought to have tested positive for COVID-19.
 17 January – HM Revenue and Customs has estimated that £4.5bn in COVID-19 support funding has been lost through error or fraud since 2020.
 18 January – BBC News reports that a woman from Pembrokeshire who shielded from COVID-19 for two and a half years has spent more than £2,000 on Evusheld (a drug not available on the NHS) to improve her immunity. The Welsh Government has responded that it is waiting for guidance on the drug from the Medicines and Healthcare products Regulatory Agency.
 20 January –
 A study by the British Heart Foundation has found that as many as half a million people in the UK missed out on starting medication to prevent heart attacks and strokes during the first 18 months after the beginning of the pandemic.
 Office for National Statistics data for the week up to 10 January indicate COVID-19 infections have continued to fall in England and Wales, with one in 40 people (an estimated 2.6% of the population) testing positive for the virus.
 22 January – The Catholic Safeguarding Standards Agency launches an "unscheduled" safeguarding audit and review into the Diocese of Hexham and Newcastle amid claims of lockdown gatherings at St Mary's Cathedral in Newcastle during England's third national lockdown in 2021. The review will be carried out by Malcolm McMahon, the Archbishop of Liverpool.
 25 January – A national study carried out using Bristol's Children of the 90s cohort has indicated that vulnerable people who receive a COVID booster vaccine are equally as protected from the virus as healthy people who received two vaccines. The study analysed 9,000 blood samples from people monitored by the project.
 26 January – MP Andrew Bridgen has threatened to sue former Health Secretary Matt Hancock after Hancock accused him on Twitter of spreading "antisemitic, anti-vax, anti-scientific conspiracy theories".
 27 January – Data released by the Office for National Statistics for the week ending 17 January indicate overall cases have continued to fall. In England, the estimated number of people testing positive for COVID-19 was 906,300 (roughly 1.62% of the population or 1 in 60 people).
 30 January –
 Analysis by BBC One's Panorama programme suggests that between 5,000 and 10,000 NHS workers who may be off sick with Long COVID will face pay cuts because of changes to COVID sickness policy.
 Dr Sarah Myhill, a private practitioner from Powys, who posted false claims about COVID-19 vaccines online, is banned from practising for nine months after a hearing conducted by the Medical Practitioners Tribunal Service.
 31 January – After the Welsh Cancer Network publishes a three year plan for improving patient experience and outcomes in Wales,  Judi Rhys, of Tenovus Cancer Care, warns that the COVID-19 pandemic cannot continue to be blamed for poor cancer care in the country.

February 2023
 3 February – Office for National Statistics data for the week up to 24 January indicates that COVID-19 cases have continued to fall, with an estimated 1 in 70 people (1.42% of the population) testing positive for the virus in England over that time. The data also shows an increase in infections among primary and secondary school children.
 6 February – Mark Steyn, who used his GB News show to cast doubt on the safety of COVID-19 vaccines, quits the news channel after claiming its bosses tried to make him pay fines issued by the media regulator Ofcom following two investigations into his programme.
 10 February – Data from the Office for National Statistics for the week ending 31 January indicates COVID-19 cases have risen in England for the first time in 2023, with 1.02 million cases, an increase of 8% from 941,800 the previous week. Data for Scotland and Wales is less clear.
 12 February – The last available date on which adults in England aged between 16 and 49 can book a COVID-19 booster injection following their two initial vaccines.
 13 February –
 Buckingham Palace announces that Camilla, Queen Consort has tested positive for COVID-19 and cancelled her engagements for the week.
 Heathrow Airport has recorded its busiest January since the start of the pandemic, with 5.4 million passengers passing through during January 2023.
 17 February – Office for National Statistics data for the week up to 7 February indicates that COVID-19 cases continued to increase in England, Wales and Scotland, but decreased in Northern Ireland. In England, In England it is estimated that 1,054,200 people had COVID-19, equating to 1.88% of the population, or around 1 in 55 people.
 22 February –
 Office for National Statistics data collected between February and November 2022 has shown a decrease in the mortality rate among people from ethnic minorities with COVID-19 when compared to the beginning of the pandemic, when mortality was highest among people from the Bangladeshi, Black Caribbean and Pakistani groups.
 A pub landlord from Billingham, County Durham who had his licence revoked by the local council after repeatedly opening the establishment during the COVID-19 lockdowns, loses a two-year legal battle following a hearing at the High Court in Leeds.
 23 February –
 The National Health Service in Wales misses its first post-COVID target for reducing the backlog of outpatients waiting for an appointment, with 75,000 people waiting for a year or more when there should be none.
 Figures produced by the Office for National Statistics show school absences in England remain above their pre-COVID levels, with 25.1% of pupils regularly absent during the autumn term of 2022 compared to 13.1% in autumn 2019.
 24 February – Office for National Statistics data for the week up to 14 February indicates COVID-19 cases continued to rise in England, Scotland and Wales, but remained uncertain in Northern Ireland. In England, the estimated number of people testing positive for COVID-19 was 1,223,000 (or 2.18% of the population and around 1 in 45 people).
 28 February –
 A letter to Baroness Hallett, the chair of the COVID-19 Inquiry, and co-authored by Covid-19 Bereaved Families for Justice and the Runnymede Foundation, has called for race to be made a central part of the inquiry because of the significantly greater impact the pandemic had on those from ethnic minorities. A spokesperson for the inquiry says that the unequal impact of the inquiry will be at the inquiry's forefront. 
 Pembrokeshire County Council is to discuss whether the establishment of a COVID-19 field hospital at Bluestone National Park Resort near Narberth in 2020 was the right location for the hospital. The hospital was given £6m, but only 30 of its 125 beds were ever available.

March 2023
 1 March – WhatsApp messages leaked to the Daily Telegraph are reported as suggesting former Health Secretary Matt Hancock chose to ignore advise from experts in April 2020 that there should be "testing of all going into care homes". A spokesman for Hancock said "These stolen messages have been doctored to create a false story that Matt rejected clinical advice on care home testing”.
 2 March –
 The Daily Telegraph publishes more of Matt Hancock's WhatsApp exchanges, this time with former Education Secretary Gavin Williamson in December 2020, when a debate into whether schools should reopen following the Christmas holiday was taking place. The leaked messages suggest Hancock favoured school closures, while Williamson was more hesitant. Hancock, who worked alongside journalist Isabel Oakeshott to co-author a book, describes the release of the messages as a "massive betrayal and breach of trust". In response, Oakeshott says she released the messages because she believed doing so was in the "public interest".
 Sir Keir Starmer unveils Sue Gray, who led the investigation into the Partygate scandal, as Labour's new Chief of Staff, sparking concern among some Conservative MPs about her impartiality.
 3 March –
 The latest leaked WhatsApp messages published by the Daily Telegraph appear to show former Health Secretary Matt Hancock and Cabinet Secretary Simon Case joking about locking people in quarantine hotels.
 The Commons Select Committee of Privileges finds that former Prime Minister Boris Johnson may have misled Parliament over the Partygate scandal after evidence suggested breaches of COVID-19 rules would have been "obvious" to him. In response Johnson says that none of the evidence shows he "knowingly" misled parliament, and that "it is clear from this report that I have not committed any contempt of parliament".
 Office for National Statistics data for the week up to 21 February indicates that COVID-19 infections were increasing in England and Wales, but decreasing in Northern Ireland, while the situation in Scotland was uncertain. In England, the number of people testing positive for COVID-19 was estimated to be 1,298,600 (roughly 2.31% of the population around 1 in 45).
 4 March – Leaked WhatsApp messages published by the Daily Telegraph indicate Matt Hancock and his staff deliberated over whether or not he had broken COVID-19 regulations after pictures of him kissing his aide, Gina Coladangelo, were published by The Sun newspaper. In another conversation, the messages show Hancock criticising the Eat Out to Help Out scheme for "causing problems" in areas where there were a nigh number of COVID-19 cases.
 5 March –
 News outlets including BBC News, Sky News and The Independent (who have not verified the messages) report that further WhatsApp messages published by The Telegraph appear to show discussions about how and when the government should reveal details of the Kent COVID-19 variant in order to ensure people would comply with the regulations. The news outlets also says Hancock appears to suggest they should "frighten the pants off everyone", while in another conversation, head of the civil service Simon Case suggests the "fear/guilt factor" was an important element of the government's messaging. The Telegraph also reports messages showing ministers and civil servants discussing "[getting] heavy with the police" to enforce lockdown measures with senior police officers being brought into Number 10 to be told to be stricter with the public.
Moderna announces Harwell, Oxfordshire as the location of its new Innovation and Technology Centre, a research and development facility which will be built by 2025.
 6 March – The Telegraph publishes messages that are reported to have been exchanged between Allan Nixon, a parliamentary Advisor and Hancock from November 2020 in which they discuss threatening to cancel projects in MPs constituencies if MPs do not support the local lockdown tiers legislation. It is also reported that as part of a strategy aimed at trying to stop MPs from rebelling against the legislation, party whips compiled a spreadsheet of 95 MPs who disagreed with this policy and the reasons for them disagreeing; these related to lack of parliamentary scrutiny, economic harm, harms to hospital, absence of cost benefit analysis and the policy being "unconservative".
 7 March – The Joint Committee on Vaccination and Immunisation recommends that everyone over 75, care-home residents and anyone considered to be extremely vulnerable aged five and over will be offered a spring COVID-19 booster vaccine. Vaccinations will begin in March in Scotland, early April in England and Wales, and mid-April in Northern Ireland.
 8 March – In what is believed to be the first case of its kind in the UK, the widow of a nurse who died as a result of COVID-19 is to sue the National Health Service in Wales. Linda Roberts, the widow of Gareth Roberts, who had Type 2 diabetes, plans the legal action after a coroner found that he died as a result of "industrial disease".
 9 March –
 The UK Health Security Agency announces that the COVID-19 Infection Survey run by the Office for National Statistics, which collects results from swabs and blood tests from a sample of households, will be paused from the middle of the month.
 A study published in the British Medical Journal suggests people's mental health was not adversely affected by the COVID-19 pandemic, and that most people made the best of a bad situation.
 10 March – Office for National Statistics data for the week ending 28 February indicates COVID-19 cases are rising in Scotland, but the picture is unclear in the rest of the UK. In England, the number of people testing positive for COVID-19 was estimated to be 1,333,400, equating to 2.38% of the population, or around 1 in 40 people. In Scotland, the figure was 128,400, equating to 2.44% of the population or around 1 in 40 people.

See also
 Timeline of the COVID-19 pandemic in the United Kingdom (January–June 2020)
 Timeline of the COVID-19 pandemic in the United Kingdom (July–December 2020)
 Timeline of the COVID-19 pandemic in the United Kingdom (January–June 2021)
 Timeline of the COVID-19 pandemic in the United Kingdom (July–December 2021)
 Timeline of the COVID-19 pandemic in the United Kingdom (January–June 2022)
 Timeline of the COVID-19 pandemic in the United Kingdom (July–December 2022)
 History of the COVID-19 pandemic in the United Kingdom
 COVID-19 vaccination in the United Kingdom

References

External links
  – analysis of advice given to government, and their response, up to early May

Coronavirus
2023 in the United Kingdom